Frode Rønning (born 7 July 1959) is a former speed skater and coach from Norway.

During many speed skating seasons, Rønning was the Norway's best sprinter. Rønning participated in the 13 sprint world championships between 1977 and 1989, he became champion in 1981, and won silver in 1978 and bronze in 1979 and 1982. He has participated in three olympics; in 1980 Olympics in Lake Placid he won a bronze medal on the 1000 m and came fourth on the 500 m at the 1984 Olympics in Sarajevo he came 7th in the 500 m, and at the 1988 Olympics in Calgary he came 10th in the 500 m.

Frode Rønning has nine Norwegian sprint championships in total 3 on the 500 m and 2 on the 1000 m. As a junior, he sat 6 junior world records on 500 m, 1000 m and overall sprint. He first skated for Leinstrand IL and later for Oslo IL and ASK (Arbeidernes Skøyteklubb – later called Aktiv Skøyteklubb).
Personal records: 37.31 - 1:15.54 - 1:59.82

External links 
 
 
 
 
 Frode Rønning at SkateResults.com

1959 births
Living people
Sportspeople from Trondheim
Norwegian male speed skaters
Norwegian speed skating coaches
Olympic speed skaters of Norway
Olympic bronze medalists for Norway
Olympic medalists in speed skating
Speed skaters at the 1980 Winter Olympics
Speed skaters at the 1984 Winter Olympics
Speed skaters at the 1988 Winter Olympics
Medalists at the 1980 Winter Olympics
World Sprint Speed Skating Championships medalists